Narwal may refer to:

Narwhal, a whale with a long helical tusk
Narwal, Pakistan, a village in Khyber Pakhtunkhwa
ARA Narwal, a 1962 Argentinian fishing trawler

People with the name 
Pardeep Narwal (b. 1996), Indian Kabaddi athlete
Rajesh Narwal (born 1990), Indian Kabaddi athlete
Sonu Narwal, Indian Kabaddi athlete
Sumit Narwal (born 1982), Indian cricketer
Surjeet Singh Narwal (born 1990), Indian Kabaddi athlete

See also 
 Narwhal (disambiguation)
 Narval (disambiguation)
 Narowal (disambiguation)